Sultan Iskandar Power Station (Malay: Stesen Janaelektrik Sultan Iskandar) is a Malaysian gas turbine power station located in Pasir Gudang, Johor.

History
Construction of the plant began in 1977 and completed in 1980. The station was officially opened in September 1981 by H.R.H. Sultan Iskandar of Johor.

See also
 List of power stations in Malaysia

Further reading

 Stesen Janaelektrik Sultan Iskandar Pasir Gudang, Johor: Sultan Iskandar Power Station Pasir Gudang, Johor, Published by Lembaga Letrik Negara Tanah Melayu, 1982, 24 pages

1981 establishments in Malaysia
Buildings and structures in Johor
Natural gas-fired power stations in Malaysia
Pasir Gudang